The 2021 CONCACAF Champions League Final was the final match of the 2021 CONCACAF Champions League, the 13th edition of the CONCACAF Champions League under its current name, and overall the 56th edition of the premier association football club competition organized by CONCACAF, the regional governing body of North America, Central America and the Caribbean.

The match was played at Estadio BBVA in Guadalupe, between Monterrey and América. Monterrey won 1–0 for their fifth Champions League title.

Teams
In the following table, final until 2008 were in the CONCACAF Champions' Cup era, since 2009 were in the CONCACAF Champions League era.

Venue 

The higher ranked team, Monterrey, hosted the final match of the 2021 CONCACAF Champions League in Guadalupe, Nuevo León.

Background
The CONCACAF Champions League was established in 2008 as the continental championship for football clubs in North America, Central America, and the Caribbean, succeeding the CONCACAF Champions' Cup. During its first nine editions, the Champions League consisted of a group stage in summer and autumn followed by a knockout stage during the following spring. Beginning with the 2018 edition of the tournament, the group stage was re-formed as the CONCACAF League and limited to Central American and Caribbean teams. The Champions League was shortened to a two-month knockout tournament between teams from North American and major Central American nations, as well as the winner of the CONCACAF League.

Road to the final
Note: In all results below, the score of the finalist is given first (H: Home; A: Away).

América

Monterrey

Format
In the final, extra time was played if the score was tied after the end of the match. If the score was still tied after extra time, a penalty shoot-out was used to determine the winner (Regulations Article 12.8).

Match

Details

See also
2021 CONCACAF League Final

References

External links
CONCACAF Champions League 

2021
Final
C.F. Monterrey matches 
Club América matches
2021–22 in Mexican football